Występ may refer to the following places:
Występ, Kuyavian-Pomeranian Voivodeship (north-central Poland)
Występ, Masovian Voivodeship (east-central Poland)
Występ, Warmian-Masurian Voivodeship (north Poland)
Występ, a live album by Kazik Na Żywo